The 2008–09 Croatian Football Cup was the eighteenth season of Croatia's football knockout competition. Dinamo Zagreb were the defending champions since they won the last year's cup by defeating Hajduk Split 3–0 on aggregate.

Calendar

Preliminary round
The preliminary round was held on 27 August 2008.

First round
The matches were played on 23 and 24 September 2008.

1Due to financial difficulties, Kamen Ingrad ceased competing on a senior professional level, and therefore withdrew from the competition.

Second round
The matches were played on 29 October 2008.

Quarter-finals
The draw was held on 30 October. First legs were held on 12 November and second legs on 26 November 2008.

|}

Semi-finals

First legs

Second legs

Hajduk Split won 4–1 on aggregate

Dinamo Zagreb won 6–1 on aggregate

Final

First leg

Second leg

3–3 on aggregate. Dinamo Zagreb won 4–3 in penalty shootout.

See also
2008–09 Croatian First Football League
2008–09 Croatian Second Football League

External links
Official website 

Croatian Football Cup seasons
Croatian Cup, 2008-09
Croatian Cup, 2008-09